Elbeğendi is a village in Mardin Province in southeastern Turkey. It is located in Midyat District and the historical region of Tur Abdin.

In the village, there are churches of Mor Jacob and Mor Barsaumo, the Virgin Mary, and Mor Bosus.

The village is populated by Assyrians and had a population of 46 in 2021.

Etymology
The Syriac name of the village is derived from "kafro" ("village" in Syriac) and "tahtayto" ("lower" in Syriac), thus Kafro Tahtayto translates to "lower village". This name serves to distinguish the village from Kafro `Elayto ("upper village" in Syriac).

History
In 1900, Kafro Tahtayto was inhabited by 30 Assyrian families. Amidst the Assyrian genocide, in 1915, the village's population fled to the Monastery of Mor Malke, and was uninhabited until the first 8 families returned in 1916.

The village's population grew to 46 families in 1970, however, they were forced to flee abroad due to the Kurdish–Turkish conflict in the 1980s, and only 5 families remained by 1992. The village was forcibly evicted by the Turkish army in 1995, and the remaining three families emigrated to Western Europe.

In 2006, 17 Assyrian families returned to the village from Augsburg and Göppingen in Germany, and Trüllikon and Zürich in Switzerland. In late July 2019, Assyrian properties in Kafro Tahtayto were struck by suspected arson attacks.

Notable people
Iskender Alptekin (1961-2010), Assyrian politician

References
Notes

Citations

Bibliography

Assyrian communities in Turkey
Tur Abdin
Villages in Midyat District
Places of the Assyrian genocide